The Train Now Departing: Twenty Years After the End of Steam is a 1988 BBC Two documentary series about railways that was broadcast 20 years after the end of steam on British Railways. It was written and narrated by Anthony Smith. A book to accompany the series was also published by BBC Books with photographs by Ivo Peters.

There were six 30 minute episodes:

 The Long Drag (about the Settle–Carlisle line
 The West Highlander (about the West Highland Line)
 The Holiday Line (about the Waterloo to Exmouth route)
 Steam on the Isle of Man (about the Isle of Man)
 Lines of Industry (about industrial railways)
 The Survivors (about preserved railways)

See also
Steam Days

References

External links 

1988 British television series debuts
1988 British television series endings
1980s British documentary television series
BBC television documentaries
English-language television shows